Port Clarence may refer to:
 Port Clarence, Alaska
 LORAN-C transmitter Port Clarence
 Port Clarence Coast Guard Station
 Port Clarence, England
 Port Clarence, Fernando Po (now Malabo, Equatorial Guinea)